Vanessa Voigt (born 7 October 1997) is a German biathlete. She won the 2020–21 Biathlon IBU Cup and represented Germany at the 2022 Winter Olympics.

Career
Voigt won the IBU Cup during the 2020–21 season. She represented Germany at the 2022 Winter Olympics in the 15 km individual race and finished in fourth place with a time of 44:29.3. She won a bronze medal in the women's relay.

Biathlon results
All results are sourced from the International Biathlon Union.

Olympic Games
1 medal (1 bronze)

World Championships

*During Olympic seasons competitions are only held for those events not included in the Olympic program.
**The single mixed relay was added as an event in 2019.

World Cup

Individual podiums
 1 podium

Relay podiums

References

External links

1997 births
Living people
German female biathletes
Biathletes at the 2022 Winter Olympics
Medalists at the 2022 Winter Olympics
Olympic biathletes of Germany
Olympic bronze medalists for Germany
Olympic medalists in biathlon
People from Schmalkalden
Sportspeople from Thuringia
Biathlon World Championships medalists